Ladonia is an unincorporated community located in the Franklin Township of northwest Surry County, North Carolina, United States.  The community generally lies on the Fisher River and is centered on the intersection of Blevins Store Road and Ladonia Church Road .  Area landmarks include Ladonia Baptist Church, M & M Signs and Awnings (right at the intersection of the two roads), and the nearby Raven Knob Scout Reservation.

References

Unincorporated communities in Surry County, North Carolina
Unincorporated communities in North Carolina